Naanum Single Thaan is a 2021 Indian Tamil-language comedy film directed by R. Gopi, starring Dinesh and Deepti Sati. It was produced by Jayakumar and Punnagai Poo Gheetha. It was released on 12 February 2021.

Plot 
Udhay is a tattoo artist who has ‘Virgin Boy’ and names of Trisha and Nayanthara tattooed on his body. After several failed attempts at wooing women, this gang of ‘Single 90s kids’ come across Swetha. What follows is two hours of Udhay, and his friends, stalking her and forcing her to ‘love’ him, and insufferable sermons about this toxic hero helping the heroine "understand his feelings."

Cast 
Dinesh as Udhay
Deepti Sati as Swetha
Rajendran as Mr Love
Manobala as Udhay's father
Rama as Udhay's mother
Kathir
Vikash Sampath
Selva

Production 
Director Gopi wrote the film's script with Vignesh Shivan and Nayanthara in mind for the lead role, but the pair turned down the offer. Dinesh was thus signed on to play a Nayanthara fan in the film. After a guest appearance in Solo (2017), Deepti Sati made her first lead appearance in Tamil cinema. Rajendran was cast as a 'love guru', while Manobala also starred in the film. The film was produced by Punnagai Poo Gheetha and Jayakumar.

The film was predominantly shot in London during mid-2019, while remaining portions were completed in Chennai.

Soundtrack 
Soundtrack was composed by Hitesh Manjunath.
Desi Lady – Lady Kash, Saisharan
Idhuvarai – Chinmayi, Nivas
Maamazhai – Armaan Malik

Release 
The film was released across theatres in Tamil Nadu on 12 February 2021, coinciding with Valentine's Day weekend. The film received predominantly negative reviews from critics, with a reviewer from Cinema Express noting "Naanum Single Thaan neither has good comedy nor good acting. All it has is an illogical love story at the heart of it. It’s a carelessly crafted story that normalises an emotionally unhealthy equation." A reviewer from Times of India wrote "even if we are just a month into the new year, one can safely predict that Naanum Single Thaan is certain to figure in the list of terrible films of 2021".

References 

2021 films
2020s Tamil-language films
2020s sex comedy films
2021 black comedy films
Indian sex comedy films
Indian romance films
Indian romantic comedy films
Films shot in Chennai
Films shot in London
2021 directorial debut films